Maginot is a French surname of Lorraine origin which may refer to:
André Maginot (1877–1932), French civil servant, soldier, and Member of Parliament
Maginot Barracks, military installation in France
Maginot Line, a line of concrete fortifications in France named after André Maginot
List of Maginot Line ouvrages
La rue du Sergent-Maginot, a street in Paris
La place André-Maginot, a square in Nancy, France
Double crime sur la ligne Maginot, a French-language film released in 1937